The Escondido River (Río Escondido in Spanish, sometimes called Arroyo Río Escondido) is a stream in the state of Coahuila, Mexico, and is a tributary of the Rio Grande.

The Escondido enters the Rio Grande (Rio Bravo del Norte in Mexico) at Rio Grande river kilometer , about  downriver from Piedras Negras, Coahuila, and Eagle Pass, Texas.

The Escondido originates in the Serranias del Burro mountain range and flows generally east to the Rio Grande. Its main tributary is the Rio San Antonio, which enters the Escondido about  upriver from the Rio Grande confluence.

See also
 List of rivers of Mexico
 List of tributaries of the Rio Grande

References

Rivers of Coahuila
Tributaries of the Rio Grande